The 2012 Cash Converters Players Championship Finals was the fifth edition of the PDC darts tournament, the Players Championship Finals, which saw the top 32 players from the 2012 PDC Players Championship Order of Merit taking part. The tournament took place from 30 November–2 December 2012 at the Butlin's Resort Minehead in Minehead, England. This was the second Players Championship Final to be held before the PDC World Championship.

Kevin Painter was the defending champion, but he lost to Michael van Gerwen in the first round.

Phil Taylor won his third and final Players Championship Finals title with a 13–6 victory over Kim Huybrechts in the final.

Prize money

Qualification
This was the final PDC ProTour Order of Merit.

Draw

Statistics
{|class="wikitable sortable" style="font-size: 95%; text-align: right"
|-
! Player
! Eliminated
! Played
! Legs Won
! Legs Lost
! LWAT
! 100+
! 140+
! 180s
! High checkout
! 3-dart average
|-
|align="left"| Phil Taylor
|Winner
|5
|
|
|
|
|
|
|170
|103.91
|-
|align="left"| Kim Huybrechts
|Final
|5
|
|
|
|
|
|
|137
|95.93
|-
|align="left"| Simon Whitlock
|Semi-finals
|4
|
|
|
|
|
|
|170
|99.26
|-
|align="left"| Justin Pipe
|Semi-finals
|4
|
|
|
|
|
|
|127
|93.41
|-
|align="left"| Gary Anderson
|Quarter-finals
|3
|
|
|
|
|
|
|140
|99.98
|-
|align="left"| Andy Hamilton
|Quarter-finals
|3
|
|
|
|
|
|
|142
|95.04
|-
|align="left"| Peter Wright
|Quarter-finals
|3
|
|
|
|
|
|
|102
|94.76
|-
|align="left"| Mervyn King
|Quarter-finals
|3
|
|
|
|
|
|
|111
|90.57
|-
|align="left"| Robert Thornton
|Second round
|2
|
|
|
|
|
|
|120
|96.29
|-
|align="left"| Michael Smith
|Second round
|2
|
|
|
|
|
|
|96
|95.68
|-
|align="left"| Michael van Gerwen
|Second round
|2
|
|
|
|
|
|
|130
|93.82
|-
|align="left"| Steve Beaton
|Second round
|2
|
|
|
|
|
|
|161
|93.47
|-
|align="left"| Brendan Dolan
|Second round
|2
|
|
|
|
|
|
|164
|93.36
|-
|align="left"| Adrian Lewis
|Second round
|2
|
|
|
|
|
|
|150
|93.31
|-
|align="left"| Wayne Jones
|Second round
|2
|
|
|
|
|
|
|121
|93.28
|-
|align="left"| Ronnie Baxter
|Second round
|2
|
|
|
|
|
|
|134
|92.02
|-
|align="left"| Raymond van Barneveld
|First round
|1
|
|
|
|
|
|
|54
|99.79
|-
|align="left"| Mark Webster
|First round
|1
|
|
|
|
|
|
|40
|94.19
|-
|align="left"| Wes Newton
|First round
|1
|
|
|
|
|
|
|106
|92.83
|-
|align="left"| James Wade
|First round
|1
|
|
|
|
|
|
|129
|89.98
|-
|align="left"| Vincent van der Voort
|First round
|1
|
|
|
|
|
|
|46
|89.80
|-
|align="left"| Ian White
|First round
|1
|
|
|
|
|
|
|97
|89.45
|-
|align="left"| Mark Walsh
|First round
|1
|
|
|
|
|
|
|36
|89.17
|-
|align="left"| Jamie Caven
|First round
|1
|
|
|
|
|
|
|85
|88.68
|-
|align="left"| Colin Osborne
|First round
|1
|
|
|
|
|
|
|82
|88.58
|-
|align="left"| Terry Jenkins
|First round
|1
|
|
|
|
|
|
|87
|88.56
|-
|align="left"| Paul Nicholson
|First round
|1
|
|
|
|
|
|
|82
|86.77
|-
|align="left"| Colin Lloyd
|First round
|1
|
|
|
|
|
|
|80
|84.97
|-
|align="left"| Richie Burnett
|First round
|1
|
|
|
|
|
|
|56
|83.90
|-
|align="left"| Kevin Painter
|First round
|1
|
|
|
|
|
|
|135
|83.62
|-
|align="left"| Dave Chisnall
|First round
|1
|
|
|
|
|
|
|–
|82.91
|-
|align="left"| Andy Smith
|First round
||1
|
|
|
|
|
|
|100
|82.30
|-

Television coverage
The tournament was broadcast in the UK by ITV4 and by Fox Sports in Australia.

References

Players Championship Finals
Players Championship Finals
Players Championship Finals
Players Championship Finals
Players Championship Finals
2010s in Somerset
Minehead
Sports competitions in Somerset